The Portrait of Terentius Neo is a Roman fresco of the 1st century AD, created circa 20–30, that was found in Pompeii in the House of Terentius Neo in Regio 7, Insula 2, 6. It is currently preserved at the National Archaeological Museum, Naples.

Description

The fresco is considered one of the finest pieces of art from the area of Vesuvius.  It was sometimes erroneously called the portrait of Paquius Proculus, but this was the result of some confusion because the fresco was not found in the House of Paquius Proculus, which is in Reg I, Ins 7, 1.

An inscription found on the outside of the house is an election recommendation by Terentius Neo. The portrait is unusual in several ways: the couple is shown of equal status and are both members of a confident and fashionable mercantile class; the portrait shows realistic imperfections or peculiarities in the faces which is rare in similar frescoes and brings to life the characters.

The pair of middle-class Pompeians are believed to be husband and wife. Terentius Neo was a bakery owner as the house had been modified to include a bakery. The man wears a toga, the mark of a Roman citizen, and holds a rotulus, suggesting he is also involved in local public and/or cultural events. The woman is in the foreground and holds a stylus and wax tablet, emphasizing that she is of equal status, educated, and literate.

References

External links
 Catalogue record at the Naples National Archaeological Museum.

1st-century paintings
Pompeii (ancient city)
Fresco paintings in Naples
Roman Empire art
Ancient Roman paintings